Mary Beth McKenzie, N.A. (born 1946) is an American painter of contemporary figures in the realism style. She was born in Cleveland, Ohio and currently resides in New York City where she teaches art at National Academy of Design and the Art Students League of New York.

Her works of art are currently in the collections of the Metropolitan Museum of Art, the National Museum of American Art,  the Brooklyn Museum, the Museum of the City of New York, the National Museum of Women in the Arts, the Butler Institute of American Art, the New Britain Museum of American Art, the Art Students League of New York, and the National Academy of Design. 
 
In 2008 the Metropolitan Museum of Art, purchased two monotypes, Front Porch Restaurant and Diner (2nd stage), as well as a plate for Front Porch Restaurant and Diner (2nd stage). The Metropolitan Museum of Art permanent collection also includes thirteen monotypes from McKenzie's Circus as well as three oils and three sketch books also by McKenzie.

McKenzie authored and provided artwork for the book, A Painterly Approach, Watson-Guptill Publications, New York, October 1987. She has also contributed articles to several magazines.

McKenzie was elected to the National Academy in 1994. She has won numerous awards.

She was educated at the Boston Museum of Fine Art, National Academy of Design, and Art Students League of New York, and the Cooper School of Art in Cleveland, and has studied with Robert Brackman, Daniel Greene, and Burton Silverman, among others.

Several of her works appear in the movie Flannel Pajamas.

She was interviewed by Ira Goldberg in the art journal LINEA

McKenzie was featured in a solo show at the Erie Art Museum, "A Life in Art"  from July 13 to September 24, 2018. See the External links for more details.

References

External links
 Mary Beth McKenzie Official Site
 Flannel Pajamas movie website. McKenzie's art appears in the trailers.
 Television interview by Richard Lewis on GDLA; at minute 4:34, mentions his painting of Larry David by McKenzie.
 Mary Beth McKenzie: An Interview
 Mary Beth McKenzie: A Life in Art

American women painters
Art Students League of New York faculty
1946 births
Living people
20th-century American painters
21st-century American painters
American women printmakers
National Academy of Design faculty
National Academy of Design alumni
National Academy of Design members
20th-century American women artists
21st-century American women artists
20th-century American printmakers
American women academics